Morgan County Correctional Complex (MCCX) is a maximum security prison in unincorporated Morgan County, near Wartburg, Tennessee, operated by the Tennessee Department of Correction. It opened in 1980. An expansion completed in 2009 increased its capacity to 2,500 prisoners. The prison is accredited by the American Correctional Association. The current warden is Mike Parris.

When the Brushy Mountain Correctional Complex closed in June 2009, its functions and most inmates and staff were transferred to the Morgan County Correctional Complex.

Notable prisoners
 Byron Looper - murderer and former politician; was held at Morgan County at the time of his death in 2013.
Perry March - former Nashville lawyer convicted in 2006 of killing his wife ten years earlier; currently incarcerated at Morgan County.
  Brandon Vandenburg - rapist in Vanderbilt rape case
  Travis Reinking - perpetrator of the Nashville Waffle House shooting

 Steven Hugueley was sentenced to death in 2003 for stabbing a prison counselor at Hardeman County Correctional Center. He used a homemade knife, stabbing the counselor 36 times until the knife broke. Hugueley had killed before: his mother in 1986 and a prison inmate in 1992. He tried to take the life of another prisoner in 1998. He was found dead in 2021, days after the state requested an execution date for him.

References

External links

Buildings and structures in Morgan County, Tennessee
Prisons in Tennessee
Capital punishment in Tennessee
1980 establishments in Tennessee